Robert Trudel (February 21, 1820 – July 29, 1886) was a politician in Quebec, Canada.

Background

He was born on February 21, 1820, in Sainte-Geneviève-de-Batiscan, Mauricie.

Mayor

Trudel was Mayor of Sainte-Geneviève-de-Batiscan from 1868 to 1873.

Member of the legislature

Trudel ran as an Independent Conservative candidate in the provincial district of Champlain in 1871 and as a Conservative in the federal district of Champlain in 1874.  Each time he lost.

He won a provincial seat in Champlain in 1881.

Death

He died in office on July 29, 1886.

References

1820 births
1886 deaths
Mayors of places in Quebec
Candidates in the 1874 Canadian federal election
Conservative Party of Quebec MNAs
Université Laval alumni